Arun Lad is a leader of Nationalist Congress Party and a member of Maharashtra Legislative Council from Pune. He defeated BJP candidate Sangram Deshmukh by around 49,000 votes in the Pune Graduate constituency of state legislative council.

Early life 
Arun Lad was born in Sangli Maharashtra, as son of G.D. Bapu Lad and Vijayatai Lad. He has completed his BSC Agriculture from Shivaji University.

Ideology 
Students should strive with the intention of gaining admission in the administrative service and overcome the unemployment crisis by aspiring to self-employment with technical vocational education and also contribute to the progress of the society, without which there is no way out.

Many of them got involved in politics, got positions, gained power with a little bit of trickery or using unwanted methods. We have never wanted to do such politics and we have never been touched by such politics.

"Since Bapu's dedicated life is in front of his eyes as an ideal, he chose to adopt the same way of life."

Even though so many historical difficulties were brought to the forefront of the revolution, the revolution was created. That factory should be number one in the country. It took a lot of hard work. Today, the factory is number one in all respects. 

The policy of hiring teachers without any money to give good quality education to the children, running the school-college without cheating the students in any way, may not have got the money, the institution may not have expanded but the institution is being run with an ideological meeting. The mental satisfaction that comes from this will not come from becoming an education emperor. So we are satisfied with the progress that has been made.

References

External links
 
 
 
 
 

People from Pune
Year of birth missing (living people)
Living people
Indian politicians
Nationalist Congress Party politicians from Maharashtra